Rodney Young may refer to:

 Rodney Young (archaeologist) (1907–1974), Near Eastern archaeologist
 Rodney Young (politician) (1910–1978), lawyer and Canadian Member of Parliament
 Rodney Young (American football) (born 1973), former American football defensive back

See also
Rod Young, presenter